Miyagawa may refer to:
Miyagawa-chō, one of the hanamachi or geisha districts in Kyoto
Miyagawa Dam, dam in the Fukushima Prefecture of Japan
Miyagawa, Mie, village located in Taki District, Mie Prefecture, Japan
Miyagawa Station, railway station in Ise

People with the surname
, Japanese women's footballer
Miyagawa Chōshun (1683–1753), Japanese painter 
Daisuke Miyagawa (born 1973), Japanese comedian and actor
Hakaru Miyagawa (1905-1949), Manager of leper hospitals
Miyagawa Isshō, Japanese painter in the ukiyo-e style
Kazuo Miyagawa (1908–1999), Japanese cinematographer
Keiko Miyagawa (born 1986), Japanese sailor
Satoshi Miyagawa (born 1977), Japanese football player
, Japanese rower
Sho Miyagawa (born 1990), Japanese professional baseball pitcher
Miyagawa Shunsui (c. 1740-60s), Japanese painter and printmaker 
Miyagawa Yashukichi (born 1888), Japanese drug trafficker

Japanese-language surnames